Chi Lin Nunnery is a large Buddhist temple complex located in Diamond Hill, Kowloon, Hong Kong. It was founded in 1934 as a retreat for Buddhist nuns and was rebuilt in the 1998 following the traditional Tang Dynasty architecture. The temple halls have statues of the Sakyamuni Buddha, the goddess of mercy Guanyin and other bodhisattvas. These statues are made from gold, clay, wood and stone.

The temple halls and the Chinese garden in front of the nunnery are open to the public daily free of charge.

In 2018, a lighting design work has been done for giving the building a new aspect, as close as possible to the original design of the building.

Design details
The Chi Lin Nunnery uses the traditional Tang Dynasty architecture with a design based on a Sukhavati drawing in the Mogao Caves. It is constructed entirely with cypress wood, without the use of any nails, and is currently the world's largest hand-made wooden building. This construction is based on traditional Chinese architectural techniques that uses special interlocking systems cut into the wood to hold them in place. The traditional Chinese architecture school adopt this kind of technique to demonstrate the harmony of mankind with nature. The Chi Lin Nunnery buildings are the only buildings to be built in this style in modern-day Hong Kong.

As a result of the new lighting design project, small spotlights have been installed on the ground floor and on the roof, while the lower entrance stairs have been illuminated by LEDs strips placed in the handrail.

Nan Lian Garden

The Nan Lian Garden, located in the opposite of the Chi Lin Nunnery, is a Chinese Classical Garden also built in the style of the Tang dynasty.

References

External links 

 
 Chinese website
 Wall Street Journal
Fodor's guide
Jackie Chan's review
Redevelopment of Chi Lin Nunnery Architects Report
Marco Petrucci Light Designer

Buddhist monasteries in Hong Kong
Buddhist temples in Hong Kong
Buddhist nunneries
Diamond Hill